Bulphan (pronounced ) is a village and former civil parish in the borough of Thurrock in the East of England and one of the traditional (Church of England) parishes in Thurrock. In 2019 it had an estimated population of 1028. In 1931 the parish had a population of 455.

History
On 1 April 1936 the parish was abolished to form Thurrock.

Bulphan's original village shop closed down in 2012. However, a new community-run shop and post office opened in early 2020, in a side extension of the village hall.

Geography
Bulphan forms part of the Orsett ward of Thurrock Council, and is part of the South Basildon and East Thurrock parliamentary constituency. It is located 21 miles (34 km) east north-east of Charing Cross in London. The Upminster post town forms a long, thin protrusion eastwards over the M25 motorway and the Greater London boundary in order to include the village. 

The main features of Bulphan are the Bulphan Village Hall and Park, St Mary The Virgin Church, and Bulphan Church Of England Academy Primary School. The church is a grade I listed building.

Nearest places are Laindon, North Ockendon, Orsett and West Horndon.

Transport
Bulphan has two bus services: the 265, which runs on Mondays, Wednesdays and Fridays between Grays and West Horndon and the 565 to Brentwood Station via West Horndon (6 times per day, Monday to Saturday). School buses run to Shenfield School and Sockets Heath. The nearest railway station is three miles away.

Education
Primary education has been provided by the Bulphan Church of England Voluntary Controlled Primary School since 1853. Located on Fen lane, it educates around 84 pupils.

Notable people
Charles Littlehales (1871-1945), cricketer and clergyman
Jim Davidson (1953-), comedian
Tony Cottee (1965-), footballer and commentator
Mick Norcross (1963-2021) reality TV performer

References

External links
St Mary The Virgin Church

 
Villages in Essex
Former civil parishes in Essex
Thurrock